Lehane is an uncommon Irish surname, typically from County Cork. Ó Liatháin is more frequently anglicized as Lane or Lyons. 

Most people with this surname derive from the ancient Munster kingdom of Uí Liatháin, which was powerful in the early to mid 1st millennium, and one of the few important Irish kingdoms to have colonies in Britain, documented in both Irish and Welsh sources (see Byrne 2001; Ó Corráin 2001). Later Uí Liatháin became politically marginalized when the Eóganachta, or more specifically the descendants of Conall Corc, came to power - although the rath they accepted from the new dynasty was the largest (Byrne 2001) - but remained relatively independent until disintegrating in the later Middle Ages.

Uí Liatháin was the sister kingdom of Uí Fidgenti, and thus its people share common ancestry with the O'Donovans, Ó Coileáins, and others. More distantly all are related to the historical Eóganachta in the stricter sense, if not by common origins in Ireland then at least by nearly two millennia of alliances and intermarriage.

The earliest documented ancestor of the Uí Liatháin and Uí Fidgenti is the 3rd or 4th century Dáre Cerbba (Dáire Cearba), otherwise known as Maine Munchaín.

People
Dennis Lehane, author of Mystic River
Faith Lehane, a character from Buffy the Vampire Slayer.
Lesley Lehane, retired distance runner.
Jan Lehane, ex-tennis player.
Bruce Lehane, track and cross country coach.
Patrick Lehane, Irish farmer and politician
Con Lehane (socialist)
Kevin Lehane, screenwriter of Grabbers

Companies
 Lehane, Mackenzie and Shand, former British civil engineering company

See also
 Castlelyons
 Castlemartyr
 Cobh
 Crimthann mac Fidaig
 Mongfind
 Scoti
 Attacotti
 Mahoonagh
 O'Donovan
 List of Celtic tribes
 Kingdoms of Ireland
 Irish name

Further reading
 Byrne, Francis J., Irish Kings and High-Kings. Four Courts Press. 2nd edition, 2001.
 Charles-Edwards, Thomas M., Early Christian Ireland. Cambridge University Press. 2000.
 Ó Corráin, Donnchadh (ed.), Genealogies from Rawlinson B 502 University College, Cork: Corpus of Electronic Texts. 1997.
 Ó Corráin, Donnchadh, "Prehistoric and Early Christian Ireland", in Foster, Roy (ed.), The Oxford Illustrated History of Ireland. Oxford University Press. 2001. pgs. 1-52.
 O'Hart, John, Irish Pedigrees. Dublin: James Duffy and Co. 5th edition, 1892.

Surnames